
Lakes is a defunct restaurant in Hilversum, Netherlands. It was a fine dining restaurant that was awarded one Michelin star in 2009 and retained that rating until 2014. 

in 2013, GaultMillau awarded the restaurant 14 out of 20 points.

Head chef of Lakes was Erik de Boer, who opened the restaurant 5 September 2007. On 12 November, it was reported that head chef Erik de Boer had left the restaurant by 1 November 2013 due to a change of course of the restaurant. On 27 November 2013 the restaurant was declared bankrupt. The restaurant remained open, due to the restaurant being moved into a new limited company with the same owner.

The restaurant is located in the former "Paviljoen Wildschut", once the hospitality building of the adjacent marina. The whole complex, compassing of a boathouse, hospitality unit, 2 staff residences and a terrace, was built in the period 1936–1938 to designs made by the well-known architect Willem Marinus Dudok. All parts of this complex are now Rijksmonument.

See also
List of Michelin starred restaurants in the Netherlands

References 

Restaurants in the Netherlands
Michelin Guide starred restaurants in the Netherlands
Defunct restaurants in the Netherlands
Hilversum